Chichester Canal is a painting by the English Romantic landscape painter, watercolourist and printmaker J. M. W. Turner. It was painted in 1828 and was commissioned by George Wyndham, 3rd Earl of Egremont. It is now in the Tate Collection.

The work depicts the Chichester Canal in Sussex, southern England. The ship is probably a collier brig, as this serene scene had commercial purpose. Its brilliant colours may have been influenced by atmospheric ash from the eruption of Mount Tambora in Indonesia (see also Year Without a Summer).

References

External links
Atmospheric effects of volcanic eruptions as seen by famous artists and depicted in their paintings. Scientific paper from Atmospheric Chemistry and Physics, 2007. Archived here.

1828 paintings
1828 in England
Paintings by J. M. W. Turner
Landscape paintings
Chichester
Canals in West Sussex
History of Sussex
Collection of the Tate galleries
Maritime paintings
Sun in art